Mount Isolation is a mountain located in Coos County, New Hampshire. The mountain is part of the Presidential Range of the White Mountains.  Mount Isolation is the highest peak on the Montalban Ridge which extends south from Boott Spur.

Isolation is in the Presidential Range–Dry River Wilderness, and as its name implies, is one of the most remote White Mountain peaks.

See also

 List of mountains in New Hampshire
 White Mountain National Forest

References

External links
 
 "Hiking Mount Isolation". Appalachian Mountain Club.
 "Mt. Isolation Hiking Guide". FranklinSites.com

Mountains of New Hampshire
White Mountains (New Hampshire)
Mountains of Coös County, New Hampshire
New England Four-thousand footers